Peronosclerospora sacchari is a plant pathogen, particularly for maize and sugarcane. It is closely related to Peronosclerospora philippinensis.

References

External links
Plantwise entry
EOL entry
Taxonomy Report from the Australian SRDC

Peronosporales
Water mould plant pathogens and diseases
Maize diseases
Sugarcane diseases